Ethmia clytodoxa is a moth of the family Depressariidae. It is known from the states of New South Wales and Queensland in Australia.

References

Moths described in 1917
clytodoxa